René Vandenhove (20 January 1889 – 20 August 1972) was a French racing cyclist. He rode in the 1919 Tour de France.

References

1889 births
1972 deaths
French male cyclists